An election to Kerry County Council took place on 5 June 2009 as part of that year's Irish local elections. 27 councillors were elected from five electoral divisions by PR-STV voting for a five-year term of office.

Results by party

Results by Electoral Area

Dingle

Killarney

Killorglin

Listowel

Tralee

References

External links
 https://www.housing.gov.ie/sites/default/files/migrated-files/en/Publications/LocalGovernment/Voting/FileDownLoad,23415,en.pdf
 Official website
 http://irelandelection.com/council.php?elecid=175&tab=constit&detail=yes&electype=5&councilid=12&electype=5
 https://irishelectionliterature.com/others-project/old-local-election-results/

2009 Irish local elections
2009